The Twentieth Century was a documentary television program sponsored by the Prudential Insurance Company that ran on the CBS network from 20 October 1957 until 4 January 1970. It was hosted by Walter Cronkite. The opening and closing theme music was written by composer George Antheil. The program presented filmed reports on news and cultural events that were important for the development of the 20th century. The show did not just present the events, but also interpreted them. Such subjects as World War I and major assassinations were presented in context.

On 20 January 1967, the show, sponsored by Union Carbide ("The Discovery Company"), was renamed The 21st Century. The show's focus changed to the future and to what humankind could look forward to. The 21st Century was cancelled after three seasons (its final broadcast was on 4 January 1970). The reason given was that the writers had run out of things to talk about. However, CBS may have wished to replace it with a more commercially successful program.

External links

1957 American television series debuts
1970 American television series endings
CBS original programming
1950s American television news shows
1960s American television news shows
1970s American television news shows
1950s American documentary television series
1960s American documentary television series
1970s American documentary television series
Black-and-white American television shows
Films scored by Laurence Rosenthal
Cultural depictions of Jawaharlal Nehru
Cultural depictions of Indira Gandhi